The Ropka industrial district (Estonian: Ropka tööstusrajoon) is a neighbourhood of Tartu, Estonia.

See also
Tartu Prison

References

Tartu